Bjørn Kristian Selander (born January 28, 1988) is an American professional road racing cyclist of Norwegian descent. Selander currently rides cyclocross for Donkey Label Cycling.  Selander completed his first and only Giro in 2011, wearing the white jersey after Stages 1 and 2, and placing 128th overall.

Major results

2008
 1st, Stages 1 & 3 (TTT), Tour of Belize
2009
 2nd, National U23 Time Trial Championships
 5th, Overall, Tour de Beauce
 7th, Univest Grand Prix
2017
 8th, Gran Prix of Gloucester, Day 2

References

External links

 Cycling Base: Bjørn Selander
Optum-Kelly Benefit Strategies: Bjørn Selander

1988 births
Living people
American male cyclists
American people of Norwegian descent
People from Hudson, Wisconsin